Veretye is a rural locality (a selo) and the administrative center of Veretyevskoye Rural Settlement, Ostrogozhsky District, Voronezh Oblast, Russia. The population was 704 as of 2010. There are 15 streets.

Geography 
Veretye is located 19 km southwest of Ostrogozhsk (the district's administrative centre) by road. Nizhny Olshan is the nearest rural locality.

References 

Rural localities in Ostrogozhsky District